Stigmus is a genus of aphid wasps in the family Crabronidae. There are more than 20 described species in Stigmus.

Species
These 26 species belong to the genus Stigmus:

 Stigmus americanus Packard, 1867
 Stigmus aphideperda Rohwer
 Stigmus aphidiperda Rohwer, 1911
 Stigmus convergens Tsuneki, 1954
 Stigmus cuculus Dudgeon in Nurse, 1903
 Stigmus fraternus Say, 1824
 Stigmus fulvicornis Rohwer, 1923
 Stigmus fulvipes W. Fox, 1892
 Stigmus hubbardi Rohwer, 1911
 Stigmus inordinatus W. Fox, 1892
 Stigmus japonicus Tsuneki, 1954
 Stigmus kansitakuanus Tsuneki, 1971
 Stigmus marginicollis (Cameron, 1908)
 Stigmus montivagus Cameron, 1891
 Stigmus munakatai Tsuneki, 1954
 Stigmus murotai Tsuneki, 1977
 Stigmus nigricoxis Strand, 1911
 Stigmus parallelus Say, 1837
 Stigmus paternus
 Stigmus pendulus Panzer, 1804
 Stigmus podagricus Kohl, 1890
 Stigmus quadriceps Tsuneki, 1954
 Stigmus rumipambensis Benoist, 1942
 Stigmus shirozui Tsuneki, 1964
 Stigmus solskyi A. Morawitz, 1864
 Stigmus temporalis Kohl, 1892

References

External links

 

Crabronidae
Articles created by Qbugbot